Matt Bevans (born 19 September 1993) is an English footballer. He played professionally for Oxford United having started his career as a scholar at Watford.

Career
Bevans started a two-year scholarship at Watford in the summer of 2010. In September 2011 he suffered a knee injury against Southampton's Academy which was anticipated to rule him out for the rest of the season. As a consequence, Bevans' scholarship was "extended by a few months" in April 2012.

On 16 November 2012, Bevans joined Chesham United of the Southern Football League Premier Division on loan for thirty days. This was subsequently lengthened to the end of January, and his contract at Watford was extended until the end of the 2012–13 season.

Bevans was released by Watford in June 2013 and he subsequently joined League Two side Oxford United for the 2013–14 season. He made his professional debut on 5 December 2013 in a 1–0 FA Cup win over Gateshead. His league debut followed on 28 January 2014, when he came on as a half-time substitute at Exeter City, and his first league start and first home appearance was in a 2–1 victory over AFC Wimbledon on 1 February 2014. In total he played 12 times for Oxford in 2013-14 and the end of the season the club activated a clause in his contract to extend it for another year.

On 29 August 2014 Bevans was loaned out to Conference South side Farnborough for a month, with the deal later extended by a further two months in late September. However, while playing for Farnborough Bevans suffered a knee injury and after undergoing surgery in October, it was announced that he would be out for six to nine months. He made his return to Oxford United's development squad in a 0–0 draw against Northampton Town's reserves on 20 April 2015.

At the end of the 2014–15 season, Oxford announced that Bevans would not be offered a new contract at the club. In August National League South side Wealdstone announced they had signed Bevans for the 2015–16 season. In December he moved to another NL South side, Oxford City.

By October 2018 Bevans had returned to Chesham, leaving that month for another spell at Farnborough. In March 2019 he suffered an anterior cruciate ligament injury and Farnborough opened a fund for his treatment.

Professional career statistics

References

External links

1993 births
Living people
English footballers
Watford F.C. players
Chesham United F.C. players
Oxford United F.C. players
Farnborough F.C. players
Wealdstone F.C. players
Oxford City F.C. players
English Football League players
Southern Football League players
National League (English football) players
Association football defenders